Deborah Oropallo (born 1954) is an American artist who is best known for her digital montages. Oropallo produces artworks that conflates symbolic meanings, history and gender. Oropallo lives and works in Berkeley, California.

Background 
Oropallo was born and raised in Hackensack, New Jersey. She was heavily inspired from pop arts by prominent artists such as Andy Warhol, Jasper Johns and Robert Rauschenberg since an early age. She studied in Alfred University and got her Bachelor of Fine Arts degree from there; and later received her Masters of Fine Arts from University of California, Berkeley. 

Earlier in her career, she mostly produced paintings from already found images, but over the years has evolved to incorporate digital technology. Since 2017, she has collaborated in making video art with Andy Rappaport.

Oropallo's works are held in several museums collections, including the San Francisco Museum of Modern Art, Boise Art Museum, and Stanford University Museum of Art.

Awards 
 National Endowment for the Arts (1991)
 Modern Masters Award (1998)
 Pollock-Krasner Foundation Award (2005)

References 

1954 births
Living people
People from Hackensack, New Jersey
American digital artists
Artists from New Jersey
Women digital artists
Alfred University alumni
University of California, Berkeley alumni
20th-century American artists
20th-century American women artists
21st-century American artists
21st-century American women artists